APMCCPER (Agricultural Produce Market Committee College of Pharmaceutical Education and Research), established in 2000, is a graduate and post-graduate Pharmaceutical Educational Institute in Himatnagar. It is governed by Himatnagar Kelavani Mandal and is under the Gujarat Technological University, Ahmedabad.

External links
Official Website

Universities and colleges in Gujarat
Sabarkantha district
Educational institutions established in 2000
2000 establishments in Gujarat
Pharmacy schools in India